Philosophical Institution may refer to:

 Beaumont Philosophical Institution, see John Thomas Barber Beaumont
 Cornwall Literary and Philosophical Institution, now the Royal Institution of Cornwall
 Edinburgh Philosophical Institution, now the Royal Society of Edinburgh
 Paisley Philosophical Institution

See also
 Philosophical Society